The 1968 All-Ireland Intermediate Hurling Championship was the eighth staging of the All-Ireland hurling championship. The championship ended on 29 September 1968.

London were the defending champions and successfully retained the title following a 4-15 to 0-3 defeat of Dublin in the final.

External links
 Rolls of honour

Intermediate
All-Ireland Intermediate Hurling Championship